Wadi al-'Ula is a wadi in western Saudi Arabia.
Wadi Al Ula is a tributary of the Wadi Jizal.

The main town of the Wadi Al Ula' is Al-'Ula.

history 
About 4km from the modern town of Al-'Ula are a set of ruins, These ruins here are the remnant of a former Capital of the Dedanites, which was flourishing from 800BC to the 1st century. At this time the wadi was a stop on the spice routes. Agriculture and shepherding were the main economic staples of The Wadi s population at this time.

There was also a pilgrimage site in the hills nearby, and the walls of the Wadi are covered with ancient pictographs.

The city ceased in about 100AD with the control of the trade routes by the Nabataeans to the east and incursions by the Romans.

The wadi has been tentatively identified with Wadi al-Qura of early Islamic times.

Etymology
The name means  “valley of villages”.

References

Valleys of Saudi Arabia
Geography of Saudi Arabia